The AFC Challenge Cup was an international football competition for Asian Football Confederation (AFC) member countries that was categorized as "emerging countries" in the "Vision Asia" programme. "Vision Asia", created by former AFC president, Mohammed Bin Hammam, is the AFC's plan for a continent wide programme to raise the standards of Asian football at all levels. The AFC Challenge Cup, which reflected the philosophy of Vision Asia, was created for teams to experience playing in a continental competition with the possibility to win an AFC trophy and to potentially discover new talent.

The inaugural tournament was hosted by Bangladesh in 2006 and was held biennially. An amendment to men's national team competitions in July 2006, meant that starting with the 2008 and 2010 editions of the AFC Challenge Cup, the winners automatically qualify for the AFC Asian Cup.

In the 2011 and 2015 AFC Asian Cup tournaments, two qualification spots have been allocated to the two most recent AFC Challenge Cup winners. The 2014 tournament was the last edition of this competition, due to the expansion of the Asian Cup to the 24-nations format from the 16-nations one after the 2015 edition. In April 2016, due to several associations requesting a new competition to replace the Challenge Cup as they were having problems arranging friendly matches, the AFC created the AFC Solidarity Cup.

Selection of teams
The AFC initially divided their 46 member nations into three groups in 2006. Although the tournament is meant for the countries of emerging associations class, some countries from the developing associations class have participated in the qualification and the finals of the tournament such as India, Maldives, Myanmar, North Korea, Tajikistan and Turkmenistan. As a result, only one team from the emerging class ever won the tournament, when Palestine won in 2014. In late March 2012, the Northern Mariana Islands Football Association, although only an associate member of the AFC, was approved by the AFC to enter their national team in the competition. In November 2012, the AFC announced North Korea's exclusion from future AFC Challenge Cups.

The top 15 are classed as developed associations:

 
 
 
 
 
 
 
 
 
 
 
 
 
 
 

The next 14 are classed as developing associations:

 
 
 
 
 
 
 
 
 
 
 
 
 
 

The last 17 are classed as emerging associations, which need time to develop their football. They are eligible in the AFC Challenge Cup. These are the teams which participate:

Results

Successful national teams

Participating nations

Legend

For each tournament, the number of teams in each of the finals tournament are shown.

Champions by region

Summary

AFC Challenge Cup (2006-2014)

AFC Challenge Cup (Qualification) (2008-2014)

Awards

Most Valuable Players

Top scorers

Winning coaches

See also
 AFC Solidarity Cup

References

External links

 
3
Defunct international association football competitions in Asia
Recurring sporting events established in 2006
Recurring sporting events disestablished in 2014